Fín was an Irish Princess, who lived during the 7th century.  She was a daughter or granddaughter of Colmán Rímid (died 604) of Cenél nEógain.

She formed some sort of marriage with Oswiu of Northumbria (c. 612 – 15 February 670), by whom she had Aldfrith (d. 14 December 704/705),

Family tree

     Báetán mac Muirchertaig
     | 
     |___
     |                   |           |            |             |
     |                   |           |            |             |
     Colmán Rímid        Máel Umai   Forannán     Fergus        Ailill.
     |                               |            |             |
     |                               |            |             |_
     ?                         Hui Forannáin   Cenél Forgusa    |                          |
     |                                                          |                          |
     |                                                          Cenn Fáelad mac Aillila    Sabina
     Fín   =    Oswiu of Northumbria                                                 |
                 |                                                                         |
                 |                                                                         Cuthbert of Lindisfarne
                 Aldfrith
                 |
                 |__
                 |                         |      |        |
                 |                         |      |        |
                 Osred I of Northumbria    Offa   Osric?   Osana?

External links
 http://medievalscotland.org/kmo/AnnalsIndex/Feminine/Fine.shtml
 http://www.celt.dias.ie/publications/celtica/c22/c22-64.pdf 

7th-century Irish people
People from County Tyrone
Year of birth unknown
Irish princesses
7th-century Irish women
604 deaths